Sir Walter Blake, (bef. 1672–May 1748), 6th Bt., was a minor Irish aristocrat and politician from County Galway.

Biography

Blake was the son of Sir Thomas Blake and Maria French. In October 1686, Walter Blake succeeded to the title of 6th Baronet Blake of Menlough. During the Williamite war in Ireland, he was a captain in Colonel Dillon's Regiment of Foot of King James II's Irish Army.

Blake was Member of Parliament for Galway County in the Patriot Parliament of 1689. He was the first Roman Catholic of distinction to join William of Orange's forces, where he raised and maintained a regiment at his own expense.

Blake lived in Menlough, County Galway. In 1687, he married Anne Kirwan, daughter of Sir John Kirwan. In 1706, he married Agnes Blake, daughter of John Blake.

Blake died in May 1748 in Marlborough Street, Dublin. He was succeeded as Baronet Blake by his son, Thomas Blake.

External links
 thePeerage.com Person Page 14379

Year of birth missing
1748 deaths
Irish soldiers in the army of James II of England
18th-century Irish people
Members of the Parliament of Ireland (pre-1801) for County Galway constituencies
Politicians from County Galway
Williamite military personnel of the Williamite War in Ireland
Baronets in the Baronetage of Ireland
Irish MPs 1689